Lacrimispora algidixylanolyticum  is an obligately anaerobic, psychrotolerant, xylan-degrading and spore-forming bacterium from the genus of Lacrimispora which has been isolated from vacuum packed lamb in New Zealand.

References

 

Bacteria described in 2000
Lachnospiraceae